Bulgaria participated in the Junior Eurovision Song Contest for the first time in . Bulgarian National Television (BNT), a member organisation of the European Broadcasting Union (EBU), have been responsible for the selection process of their participants, since their debut in 2007. The first representative to participate for the nation at the 2007 contest was Bon-Bon with the song "Bonbolandiya", which finished in 7th place out of 17 participating entries, achieving a score of 86 points. Bulgaria's return to the contest in  proved to be successful, when Krisia, Hasan & Ibrahim represented them with the song "Planet of the Children", achieving 147 points and finishing in second place out of 16 participating countries, it compared to Eurovision Song Contest 2017 when the country finished in 2nd place and gained the country's best ever result in a Eurovision competition. On 11 June 2016, Lidia Ganeva won the national selection "Decata na Bulgaria sa super", earning the right to represent Bulgaria at the Junior Eurovision Song Contest 2016, in Valletta, Malta. Ganeva performed the internally selected song "Magical Day (Valsheben den)" at the contest. She received 161 points and therefore finished in 9th place out of 17 participating countries.

History

Bulgaria has entered the Junior Eurovision Song Contest six times, first entering in 2007. Bulgaria's first entry was Bon-Bon with "Bonbolandiya", which finished 7th at the 2007 contest in Rotterdam. Their second entry was Krestiana Kresteva with "Edna mechta", which finished 15th and last at the 2008 contest, receiving only 15 points. The Bulgarian broadcaster BNT withdrew from the 2009 contest, and Bulgaria did not compete in the contest in Kyiv or at the 2010 edition in Minsk. Bulgaria returned for the 2011 contest in Yerevan, then they took a break from the 2012 and the 2013 contests.

Bulgaria returned for the 2014 edition in Malta, earning their best ever result in a Eurovision competition when Krisia, Hasan & Ibrahim placed second performing "Planet of the Children". Their success helped reinvigorate public interest in the contest. According to Google Trends, Junior Eurovision was the eighth fastest trending event in Bulgaria for 2014, ahead of the Australian Open 2014 and New Year's 2014.

On 26 January 2015, it was announced that Bulgaria would host the 2015 edition at the Arena Armeec in Sofia on 21 November. The 2015 junior contest has been credited by some for providing BNT with the financial support they needed to return to the adult Eurovision in 2016, for their first Eurovision since 2013 - perhaps not coincidentally, their entrant in Stockholm was the Junior Eurovision's 2015 host, Poli Genova. In June 2016 BNT selected their artist for the Junior Eurovision Song Contest 2016 in Valletta, Lidia Ganeva. After initially confirming their participation for the 2017 contest in Georgia, Bulgaria withdrew their application due to restructuring within the broadcaster and did not appear on the final list of countries released by the EBU on 9 August 2017. On 28 April 2021, Bulgaria announced they would not return in 2021. However, on 2 September 2021, Bulgaria was confirmed to be returning to the contest after last participating in 2016. Bulgaria once again withdrew from the 2022 edition for unknown reasons.

Participation overview

Awards

Winners of the press vote

Commentators and spokespersons

The contests are broadcast online worldwide through the official Junior Eurovision Song Contest website junioreurovision.tv and YouTube. In 2015, the online broadcasts featured commentary in English by junioreurovision.tv editor Luke Fisher and 2011 Bulgarian Junior Eurovision Song Contest entrant Ivan Ivanov. The Bulgarian broadcaster, BNT, sent their own commentator to each contest in order to provide commentary in the Bulgarian language. Spokespersons were also chosen by the national broadcaster in order to announce the awarding points from Bulgaria. The table below list the details of each commentator and spokesperson since 2007.

Hostings

See also
Bulgaria in the Eurovision Song Contest – Senior version of the Junior Eurovision Song Contest.
Bulgaria in the Eurovision Young Dancers – A competition organised by the EBU for younger dancers aged between 16 and 21.
Bulgaria in the Eurovision Young Musicians – A competition organised by the EBU for musicians aged 18 years and younger.
Bulgaria in the Turkvision Song Contest – A contest for countries and regions which are of Turkic-speaking or Turkic ethnicity.

References

 
Bulgaria